Minuscule 563 (in the Gregory-Aland numbering), ε 160 (in the Soden numbering), is a Greek minuscule manuscript of the New Testament, on parchment. Palaeographically it has been assigned to the 11th century. 
Scrivener labelled it by number 519.

Description 

The codex contains a complete text of the four Gospels on 198 parchment leaves (size ), with only one lacuna in John 21:19-25. The manuscript was written by many hands. The writing is in one column per page, 20-26 lines per page.

The manuscript has survived in bad condition.

Text 

The Greek text of the codex Hermann von Soden classified to the textual family Kx. Aland did not placed it in any Category.
According to Claremont Profile Method it represents the textual family Kx in Luke 10. In Luke it represents mixed text, in Luke 20 it has mixed Byzantine text.

The text of Matthew 16:2b–3 (Signs of the Times) and John 21:19-25 were omitted by the original scribe.

History 

The manuscript contains the inscription "ex libris Domini Johannis Chesselaei", and seems to have been presented to Edinburgh University Library by Sir John Chessley about 1650. The manuscript was announced by Gustav Haenel. It was added to the list of New Testament manuscripts by Scrivener.

Currently the manuscript is housed at the Edinburgh University Library (MS 219) in Edinburgh.

See also 

 List of New Testament minuscules
 Biblical manuscript
 Textual criticism

References

Further reading 

 Gustavus Haenel, Catalogi librorum manuscriptorum qui in bibliothecis Galliae, Helvetiae, Belgii, Britaniae M., Hispaniae, Lusitaniae Asservantur, Lipsiae 1830.

Greek New Testament minuscules
11th-century biblical manuscripts